Trippin' or Trippin may refer to:
Trippin, a Malaysian infotainment programme
Trippin', an MTV environmental documentary television series hosted by Cameron Diaz
[[Trippin' (film)|Trippin''' (film)]], 1999
"Trippin" (Conro song), 2018
"Trippin'" (Oris Jay song), a 2001 song later covered by Cahill and retitled "Trippin' on You"
"Trippin'" (Push Push song), 1992
"Trippin'" (Total song), 1998
"Trippin' (That's the Way Love Works)", a 2005 song by Toni Braxton from Libra
"Trippin", a 2017 song by French Montana from Jungle Rules"Trippin'", a 2000 song by Godsmack from Awake''

See also
Tripping (disambiguation)
Trip (disambiguation)